Ieronim Ponyatskiy (1749 – 4 (16) July 1802) was a Russian clergyman and monastic, an archimandrite and igumen of several Russian monasteries.

Ieronim came from a family of clergymen. He was educated at the Smolensk Spiritual Seminary, he then (according to some sources) graduated from the Slavic Greek Latin Academy, and began service as a hieromonk in the navy. In 1790–1792 he was a teacher in the Kiev Theological Academy.

From 1792 on he was the igumen of the Smolensk Holy Trinity Monastery; from 1794 on an archimandrite in the Pechersky Ascension Monastery in Nizhny Novgorod and the rector of the Nizhny Novgorod Spiritual Seminary; from January 17, 1799 on, he was an archimandrite in the New Jerusalem Monastery, where he eventually was buried. On the preserved cast-iron tombstone there are relief images and the inscription: "In this place was buried the body of the former igumen of this Stauropegial New Jerusalem Resurrection Monastery, Archimandrite Ieronim, who deceased in the Lord. This took place on 4 June 1802. He lived to be 52 years and 7 months old.

Translations from the German language

Guide to parents and caregivers, St. Petersburg, 1798.
 Zollikofer: Reliable guidance to parents, educators and teachers for sensible Christian children's upbringing.
Harwood’s thoughts of the bliss of the pious, Moscow, 1783.

From the sermons of Ieronim were only published:
"On the day of the accession to the throne of Emperor Paul", St. Petersburg, 1797.
"On the occasion of the consecration of the Church of Mary Magdalene",  (M., 1801).

Also published were his poems and speeches in honor of General-in-chief Fyodor Ivanovich Glebov, St. Petersburg, 1776.

Notes

Sources

1749 births
1802 deaths
Russian theologians
Academic staff of the Kiev Theological Academy